This is a list of mammal species found in the wild in the American state of Florida. One hundred sixteen species of mammals are known to inhabit, or have recently inhabited, the state and its surrounding waters. This includes a few species, such as the black-tailed jackrabbit and red deer, that were introduced after the arrival of Europeans. It also includes the extinct Caribbean monk seal and Florida black wolf. Rodents account for roughly one quarter of all species, followed closely by mammals from the families Cetacea and Carnivora.

The species included in this list are drawn from the work of the American Society of Mammalogists (ASM), which compiled information from five different publications. Information on the international conservation status of species has been drawn from the IUCN Red List.

Chiroptera 

Of the bats listed below, thirteen are confirmed to be resident species - all of them are insectivorous. Eight species had very low numbers reported, and can be classified as accidental species: the Indiana bat, Jamaican fruit bat, buffy flower bat, Cuban flower bat, Cuban fig-eating bat, little brown bat, northern long-eared myotis, and the silver-haired bat.

Bats can be classified in two groups by their roosting habits: solitary-roosting and colony-roosting bats.

Solitary bats prefer to live in leaves, palm fronds, and Spanish moss. Resident bats in this category are the eastern red bat, the northern yellow bat, and the Seminole bat. Hoary bats are not considered residents, because they migrate to Mexico and South America to spend the winter, but are considered a native species.

The remaining species are considered to be colony-roosting bats. Darker than their solitary counterparts and less furry, these bats prefer to live under bridges, in tree holes or caves. Only three Florida species live in caves: the eastern pipistrelle, the gray bat and the southeastern myotis. Florida has the highest concentration of southeastern myotis in the world.

The greatest threat to bats in Florida is the disturbance or destruction of roost sites, due to either vandalism or urban development.

Carnivorans 

Coyotes arrived in northern Florida in the 1970s as their natural range expanded. Illegal releases, as well as the extirpation of the red wolf and gray wolf from the state, were factors in their occupation of the state. Coyotes are extremely adaptable, living in all types of forests and farms.

Florida has two types of foxes. The native gray fox can be found in the United States almost anywhere, except the northern plains and Rockies. It is sometimes confused with the red fox due to having patches of red hair. The red fox was introduced to Florida by hunting clubs, although it may have been native in the northern panhandle. Its preferred habitats are open areas, while the gray fox prefers woods.

Red wolves were once common throughout the southeastern US, including Florida. Extinct in the wild in 1980, it has been progressively introduced to select nature preserves. The present population was introduced as part of this recovery program in 1997 to the Saint Vincent National Refuge; once red wolf pups reach 18 months, they are relocated to the North Carolina portion of the program. A subspecies of red wolf, the Florida black wolf (Canis rufus floridanus) was also endemic to the state, but became extinct in the 19th century.

Bobcats are well adapted to urban development and are not a conservation concern. They make their home in hammocks, forests or swamps.

The Florida panther is a population of cougars found in Florida. Its main differences from other subspecies are longer legs, smaller size and a shorter darker coat. The skull of the Florida panther is broader and flatter with highly arched nasal bones. Reportedly only seventy adult animals are alive, and a 1992 study estimated that the subspecies would become extinct between 2016 and 2055. It was chosen in 1982 as the Florida state animal by the state's schoolchildren.

Two of the eleven species of skunks live in Florida. Both the eastern spotted skunk and the striped skunk can be found statewide (except for the Keys).

Small populations of the Everglades mink (Neogale vison evergladensis), a subspecies of American mink, are encountered near Lake Okeechobee, and in the Big Cypress Swamp-Everglades National Park area.

North American river otters are a common sight close to freshwater streams in Florida. The population is increasing.

Raccoons are prevalent in the contiguous 48 states, including Florida. Adaptable to almost all kinds of habitats, they are among the few which actually benefit from human development, since food becomes more available. Attacks by predators like the bobcat cause minimum mortality, and the main reason for raccoon deaths is considered to be car accidents. They are predators of sea turtle nests.

The Florida black bear (Ursus americanus floridanus) is a subspecies of the American black bear. Differences between subspecies are very small; the Florida black bear has a highly arched forehead and a long and narrow braincase. Estimates for 2002 indicated the number of bears statewide to be between 2,000 and 3,200, indicating an increase from the previous census in 1998. The biggest cause of concern is roadkill, although the rates of mortality are equivalent to other areas in the country.

Florida does not have seal colonies, but stray seals come ashore in Florida occasionally. The most prevalent of those have been the common seal and the hooded seal, although a bearded seal was seen in 2007. The Caribbean monk seal was native to the Caribbean Sea and the Gulf of Mexico. Once a popular prey for Bahamas fishermen, their numbers diminished greatly in the 1800s. The last sighting of the species in Florida was in 1922, and specimens have not been seen anywhere since 1952.

Cetaceans 

Of the several whales seen close to Florida, the most frequent and notable visitor is the North Atlantic right whale. Named as such because they were the "right" whales to kill, their only known calving ground is located off the coasts of Georgia and Florida. Pregnant females migrate from feeding grounds located far north and deliver calves from mid-December to March. Humpback whales are also re-colonizing the area while gray whales, once cavorting off Florida for the same reasons as the right whales, were extirpated from the Atlantic in the 17th and 18th centuries.

The most common dolphin in the state is the common bottlenose dolphin. Dolphins, like manatees, are vulnerable to red tide and have mass fatalities when one occurs. Dolphins were designated the Florida state saltwater mammal in 1975.

Even-toed ungulates 

The only native even-toed ungulate is the white-tailed deer. It is the most economically important hunting mammal in all of North America, and is one of the major prey animals of the Florida panther. There were only about 20,000 deer in Florida during the late 1930s, and the species was almost extinct in South Florida due to a campaign to eliminate tick-borne diseases. Hunt restraining measures and purchases from other states were very successful bringing the population to more than 700,000 deer statewide. A smaller subspecies, the Key deer, lives only in the Keys and numbers around 800 animals. Sambar deer were introduced in 1908 as alternative game for hunters on Saint Vincent Island. The population is between 700 and 1,000; 130 hunters are licensed per year, and each can kill up to two deer. Some red deer were released from a hunting ranch around 1967 and may still exist as a small herd.

Wild boar found their way to Florida in 1539 with Spanish colonist Hernando de Soto. Florida has 12% of the three million boars that roam in the US. They are a popular hunting prey, but are regarded as a pest, due to the damage they inflict to agriculture and environment. More than 21,000 boar were killed in 1980 alone.

Marsupials 

The Virginia opossum is the only marsupial found in North America north of the Rio Grande. It lives in wooded areas and can be easily found statewide.

Armadillos 

Cingulata are represented by the nine-banded armadillo, having migrated from Texas. Subsequent introductions and fast breeding spread the species statewide.

Primates 
Six rhesus macaques were introduced sometime in the 1930s as tourist attractions, confined to an island in a Central Florida river and flourished. Charles River Laboratories, the world's biggest producer of lab animals, maintained a free-range colony until 1999, when they were forced to remove the animals after they destroyed parts of the mangrove forests in Key Haven. Other primates with reported sightings not included in this list are crab-eating macaques and squirrel monkeys.

Lagomorphs 

All the confirmed lagomorphs in Florida are nocturnal; the black-tailed jackrabbit—introduced as a training tool for racing greyhounds from 1930 to 1950; the native eastern cottontail, which can be found anywhere but in forests and coastal marshes; and the marsh rabbit, which prefers freshwater and brackish marshes. The subspecies Lower Keys marsh rabbit has the scientific name Sylvilagus palustris hefneri after Hugh Hefner—because research on the subspecies was financed in part by the Playboy Foundation.

Rodents 

Of the several species of rodents in Florida, the subspecies of oldfield mouse are the biggest conservation concern, along with the Florida mouse and Florida salt marsh vole. Six of eight subspecies of the oldfield mouse (commonly named beach mice) are in endangered status, and one is extinct. Given causes for their demise is predators like cats and red foxes and destruction of their natural habitats. The Florida mouse is on the endangered species list because of destruction of their habitat. The Florida mouse and Florida salt marsh vole are the only mammals that are endemic to Florida. The mouse depends on the gopher tortoise (also endangered) for its survival, because it makes its burrows from tortoise burrows, or in the absence of those, oldfield mouse burrows.

Non-native species brought in boats by colonizers are the black rat, brown rat and house mouse. Other non-natives are the capybara, the nutria and the Mexican gray squirrel.

Shrews and moles 

Four species of shrews (eulipotyphlans) are found across Florida. Two known subspecies are the Homosassa shrew (Sorex longirostris eionis) and Sherman's short-tailed shrew (Blarina carolinensis shermanii). One of their main predators is the cat. Completing the Eulipotyphla are two species of moles.

Sirenia 

Trichechus manatus latirostris is one of the two subspecies of the West Indian manatee. This herbivorous aquatic mammal lives in rivers, springs and shallow coastal waters. It was designated the state marine mammal in 1975 and is protected by federal and state laws. Threatened by habitat loss, entanglements in fishing gear and crab traps, or by being asphyxiated or crushed by canal locks and flood gates, the most common cause for manatee deaths is being struck by boats, which caused one quarter of all deaths recorded since 1974. In 2015, the statewide population was estimated at 6,063.

References
General
 
 
 
 
 
 
Specific

Mammals
Florida